Stonogobiops is a genus of gobies native to the Indian and Pacific oceans.  This is one of the "shrimp goby" genera, the members of these genera being commensal with various species of shrimps.

Species
There are currently seven recognized species in this genus:
 Stonogobiops dracula Polunin & Lubbock, 1977 (Dracula shrimp-goby)
 Stonogobiops larsonae (G. R. Allen, 1999) (Larson's shrimpgoby)
 Stonogobiops medon Hoese & J. E. Randall, 1982
 Stonogobiops nematodes Hoese & J. E. Randall, 1982 (Filament-finned prawn-goby)
 Stonogobiops pentafasciata Iwata & Hirata, 1994
 Stonogobiops xanthorhinica Hoese & J. E. Randall, 1982 (Yellownose prawn-goby)
 Stonogobiops yasha Yoshino & Shimada, 2001 (Orange-striped shrimpgoby)

References

 
Gobiidae